National Disaster Management Authority, abbreviated as NDMA, is an apex Body of Government of India, with a mandate to lay down policies for disaster management. NDMA was established through the Disaster Management Act enacted by the Government of India on 23 December 2005.  NDMA is responsible for framing policies, laying down guidelines and best-practices for coordinating with the State Disaster Management Authorities (SDMAs) to ensure a holistic and distributed approach to disaster management.

Background 
The phrase disaster management is to be understood as a continuous and integrated process of planning, organising, coordinating and implementing measures, which are necessary or expedient for the prevention of danger or threat of any disaster mitigation or reduction of risk of any disaster or severity of its consequences, capacity building, preparedness to deal with any disaster, prompt response, assessing the severity or magnitude of effects of any disaster, evacuation, rescue, relief, rehabilitation and reconstruction'.

Members 
It is headed by the Prime Minister of India and can have up to nine other members. Since 2020, there have been five other members. There is a provision to have a Vice Chair-person if needed.

Vision 
NDMA has a vision to "build a safer and disaster resilient India by a holistic, pro-active, technology-driven and sustainable development strategy that involves all stakeholders and fosters a culture of prevention, preparedness and mitigation".

Functions and responsibilities

NDMA, as the apex body, is mandated to lay down the policies, plans and guidelines for Disaster Management to ensure timely and effective response to disasters. Towards this, it has the following responsibilities:
 Lay down policies on disaster management;
 Approves the National Plan;
 Approve plans prepared by the Ministries or Departments of the Government of India in accordance with the National Plan;
 Lay down guidelines to be followed by the State Authorities in drawing up the State Plan;
 Lay down guidelines to be followed by the different Ministries or Departments of the Government of India for the purpose of integrating the measures for prevention of disaster or the mitigation of its effects in their development plans and projects;
 Coordinate the enforcement and implementation of the policy and plans for disaster management;
 Recommend provision of funds for the purpose of mitigation;
 Provide such support to other countries affected by major disasters as may be determined by the Central Government;
 Take such other measures for the prevention of disaster, or the mitigation, or preparedness and capacity building for dealing with threatening disaster situations or disasters as it may consider necessary;
 Lay down broad policies and guidelines for the functioning of the National Institute of Disaster Management.
NDMA also equips and trains other Government officials, institutions and the community in mitigation for and response during a crisis situation or a disaster. It works closely with the National Institute of Disaster Management for capacity building. It develops practices, delivers hands-on training and organizes drills for disaster management. It also equips and trains disaster management cells at the state and local levels.

NDMA, under the Ministry of Home Affairs can also be assigned with the responsibility for protection of cyber critical infrastructure. As a result NDMA has overlapping responsibilities with CERT-IN of MeitY and NCIIPC of the NTRO when it comes to securing critical/non-critical infrastructure.

Programs
NDMA ( National Disaster Management Authority) runs various programs for mitigation and responsiveness for specific situations. These include the National Cyclone Risk Management Project, School Safety Project, Decision Support System and others. India Disaster Response Summit held on 9 November 2017 held at New Delhi. This Summit was jointly organised by the National Disaster Management Authority (NDMA) and social networking site Facebook. India has become the first country to partner with Facebook on disaster response.

NDMA guidelines 
Following are the guidelines as per NDMA's official website:
 Guidelines for Preparation of Action Plan - Prevention and Management of Heat Wave
 Landslide Risk Management Strategy
 Guidelines on Disability Inclusive Disaster Risk Reduction
 Guidelines on Temporary Shelters for Disaster-Affected Families
 Guidelines on Prevention & Management of Thunderstorm & Lightning/Squall/Dust/Hailstorm & Strong Winds
 Guidelines on Boat Safety
 Guidelines on Cultural Heritage Sites and Precincts
 Guidelines on Museums
 Guidelines on Minimum Standards of Relief
 Guidelines on Hospital Safey
 Guidelines on School Safety Policy
 Guidelines on Seismic Retrofitting of Deficient Buildings and Structures
 Guidelines on Scaling, Type of Equipment and Training of Fire Services
 Guidelines on National Disaster Management Information and Communication System
 Guidelines on Management of Drought
 Guidelines on Management of Urban Flooding
 Guidelines on Management of Dead in the Aftermath of Disaster
 Guidelines on Management of Tsunamis
 Guidelines on Incident Response System
 Guidelines on Psycho-Social Support and Mental Health Services in Disasters
 Guidelines on Management of Chemical(Terrorism) Disasters
 Guidelines on Management of Landslides and Snow Avalanches
 Guidelines on Management of Nuclear and Radiological Emergencies
 Guidelines on Management of Biological Disasters
 Guidelines on Management of Cyclones
 Guidelines on Management of Floods
 Guidelines on Medical Preparedness and Mass Casualty Management
 Guidelines on Preparation of State Disaster Management Plans
 Guidelines on Chemical Disasters
 Guidelines on Management of Earthquakes

See also
 National Disaster Response Force

References

External links
 Official website

Government agencies of India
Ministry of Home Affairs (India)
Organisations based in Delhi
Government agencies established in 2005
Emergency management in India
Cyber Security in India